Otothyropsis piribebuy is a species of catfish in the family Loricariidae. It is native to South America, where it is known to occur in the Piribebuy River and the Aguaray River, which are part of the Paraguay River basin in Paraguay. It is found in areas with marginal vegetation and reaches 2.9 cm (1.1 inches) SL. The species is known to be collected for the aquarium trade, where it may be confused with fish of the genus Otocinclus, which are in the same family and are visually similar.

References 

Loricariidae
Otothyrinae
Fish described in 2011
Fauna of Paraguay